Poland competed at the 1946 European Athletics Championships in Oslo, Norway, from 22-25 August 1946. A delegation of 18 athletes were sent to represent the country.

Medals

References

European Athletics Championships
1946
Nations at the 1946 European Athletics Championships